Michael Dobbyn Hassard (1817 – 7 April 1869) was an Irish Conservative Party politician from County Waterford.

Hassard was educated at Trinity College Dublin, where graduated with a gold medal (the university's award for an outstanding student), and became a lawyer. In 1846 he married his cousin Anne Hassard, the daughter of Sir Francis John Hassard.
They lived at Glenville, County Waterford, and had 2 sons: William and Richard.

He was elected at the 1857 general election as the Member of Parliament (MP) for Waterford City,
and was re-elected in 1859.
In each session, he acted as Chair of Committees.

He stood down from the House of Commons at the 1865 general election, and became a member of the House of Commons Court of Referees, which considers whether a petitioner is entitled to make a challenge against a Private Bill.

Hassard died aged 51 on 7 April 1869, at his home in Glenville, after being ill with a fever for three weeks.

References

External links 
 

1817 births
1869 deaths
Members of the Parliament of the United Kingdom for County Waterford constituencies (1801–1922)
UK MPs 1857–1859
UK MPs 1859–1865
Irish Conservative Party MPs
Alumni of Trinity College Dublin
19th-century Irish lawyers